is a retired Japanese Nippon Professional Baseball player.

External links

1978 births
Japanese baseball players
Living people
Nippon Professional Baseball outfielders
Baseball people from Fukushima Prefecture
Yomiuri Giants players
Japanese baseball coaches
Nippon Professional Baseball coaches